Dichomeris fareasta is a moth in the family Gelechiidae. It was described by Kyu-Tek Park in 1994. It is found in south-eastern Siberia and Korea.

The length of the forewings is 9.5–11 mm. The forewings are greyish brown with a black stigma at the base, a small black spot near the basal one-fourth and two similar spots near the middle and one near the end of the cell, edged with white scales posteriorly. There are also numerous irregularly scattered black spots and two to three dark brown spots along the anterior margin. The hindwings are grey, but darker posteriorly.

References

Moths described in 1994
fareasta